Jahanka is a Manding language of The Gambia and Guinea. It is partially intelligible with Mandinka. (The Jahanka of Senegal and Guinea-Bissau is a dialect of Kassonke.)

References

Manding languages